Jeffrey Wayne King (born  December 26, 1964) is a former professional baseball player who played for the Pittsburgh Pirates and Kansas City Royals.

Career
King graduated from Rampart High School in Colorado Springs in 1983. He was drafted first overall by Pittsburgh in the 1986 June Amateur Draft, after playing college ball at the University of Arkansas. He played his 1987–88 seasons with the Eastern Leagues Harrisburg Senators before being promoted to Pittsburgh.

King was a key part of the Pirates Division Championship teams of 1990, 1991, and 1992, batting 6th right after Barry Bonds, Andy Van Slyke and Bobby Bonilla. He was plagued by back injuries which forced Bonilla to play third base during the 1990 NLCS.

King was then traded after a career-best 1996 season to Kansas City with Jay Bell for Joe Randa. In two full seasons with the Royals, he hit 28 and 24 home runs. King was the Royals regular first baseman at the beginning of the 1999 season, but, bothered by back problems, he abruptly announced his retirement on May 23, 1999, two days after going 1–4 against the Texas Rangers. Sportswriter Joe Posnanski, who covered King when Posnanski worked for the Kansas City Star, reported that King disliked baseball so much that he retired the day after his pension from Major League Baseball fully vested.

King was the third player—the first two being Willie McCovey and Andre Dawson—to hit two home runs in the same inning twice during his career. On August 8, 1995, he hit two home runs in the second inning of the Pirates' 9–5 victory over the San Francisco Giants at Candlestick Park. On April 30, 1996, he repeated this feat, this time in the fourth inning of the Pirates' 10–7 victory over the Cincinnati Reds at Cinergy Field. Alex Rodriguez and Edwin Encarnación would later accomplish this feat.

King finished his career with a .256 batting average and 154 home runs in 1,201 games.

References

External links

The 100 Greatest Royals of All-Time- #69 Jeff King

Baseball players from Indiana
Pittsburgh Pirates players
Kansas City Royals players
1964 births
Living people
Major League Baseball first basemen
Major League Baseball second basemen
Major League Baseball third basemen
Arkansas Razorbacks baseball players
Sportspeople from Colorado Springs, Colorado
People from Marion, Indiana
Prince William Pirates players
Harrisburg Senators players
Salem Buccaneers players
Buffalo Bisons (minor league) players
All-American college baseball players
Mat-Su Miners players